Gilów  is a village in the administrative district of Gmina Goraj, within Biłgoraj County, Lublin Voivodeship, in eastern Poland.

The village has a population of 205 as of the most recent census.

References

Villages in Biłgoraj County